David Kwasi Anaglate was a Ghanaian journalist, lawyer and public servant. He was the Director General of the Ghana Broadcasting Corporation (GBC) from 1992 to 1995, and Ghana's ambassador to Togo from 1996 to 2001. He is the Chairman of the Ghana Association of past Broadcasters of GBC (GASBROAD), and head of the Anaglate family.

Early life and education 
Anaglate had his secondary  education at the Accra Academy prior to obtaining his Intermediate bachelor's degree from the Kwame Nkrumah University of Science and Technology (then Kumasi College Technology) in 1959. He later studied Radio-TV Arts at Ryerson University (then Ryerson Polytechnical Institute) in Toronto, Canada. In 1980, he obtained his bachelor of laws degree (LLB) from the University of Ghana. He later entered the Ghana School of Law where he graduated in 1981 as a Barrister-at-Law.

Career 
After his studies at the Kwame Nkrumah University of Science and Technology, he joined Graphic Corporation, and also taught French and Mathematics until 1962 when he joined the Ghana Broadcasting Corporation (GBC). At GBC, he worked as a newsman. He was later put in charge of Programmes, News and Current Affairs in 1982, and six years later, he was appointed deputy Director-General of the Ghana Broadcasting Corporation.

As a journalist, he was elected a member of the executive body of the Ghana Journalists Association (GJA) in 1976. He was elected to serve on the Ghana Press Commission as one of the Ghana Journalists Association's two representatives.

In 1992 Anaglate was appointed Director General of the Ghana Broadcasting Corporation. He served in this capacity until 1995. Prior to his retirement in 1995, he was relieved of his duties and replaced by Dr. Kofi Frimpong who acted as Director-General for the period. Anaglate was later reinstated as Director-General until his retirement in 1995. He was succeeded by his then deputy, Dr. Kofi Frimpong. A year later, he was appointed Ghana's ambassador to Togo. He held this post from 1996 to 2001. He was succeeded by Mr. Kwabena Mensah-Bonsu.

References 

Ghanaian television journalists
Ghanaian diplomats
Year of birth missing
Year of death missing
Kwame Nkrumah University of Science and Technology alumni
Toronto Metropolitan University alumni
University of Ghana alumni
Ghana School of Law alumni
Alumni of the Accra Academy